Darrell “Burt” Delavan (December 2, 1929 – August 15, 2013) [4] was an American football tackle. He was a three year letterman at the College of Pacific, and was selected by the Rams in the 1952 NFL draft. In 1953 Delavan was drafted by the U.S. Army, and played for the Fort Ord Warriors for the 1953 and 1954 seasons. After his return to the Rams, in September 1955 he was traded to the Chicago Cardinals from 1955 to 1956.

He died on August 15, 2013, in Carmichael, California at age 83.

References

1929 births
2013 deaths
American football tackles
Menlo Oaks football players
Pacific Tigers football players
Chicago Cardinals players